The Military-Industrial Commission of the USSR or VPK commission under the Soviet Council of Ministers from 1957 to 1991. The VPK was a Commission of the Presidium of the Council of Ministers, and a deputy chairman of the Council headed it. The Soviet VPK's primary function was to facilitate plan fulfillment by easing bottlenecks, enforcing inter-ministerial cooperation, and overseeing the availability of resources.

History
The VPK was officially formed in December 1957.

Chairmen of the VPK
1957-63: Dmitriy Ustinov
1963-85: Leonid Smirnov
1985-91: Yuri Maslyukov

See also
People's Commissariat of Defence Industry of the USSR
People's Commissariat of Arms of the USSR
Military-Industrial Commission of Russia

Footnotes

References
Rockets and People, Volume III: Hot Days of the Cold War, by Boris Evseevich Chertok, pub Government Printing Office, 2005, .
The Collapse of the Soviet Military, by General William E. Odom, pub Yale University Press, 1998, .

Military of the Soviet Union
Government of the Soviet Union